Captain Sir William Gifford (c.1649-1724) was a Royal Navy officer and member of parliament.

Career
Born the son of Sir Richard Gifford of King's Somborne, Gifford joined the Royal Navy around 1670 and was promoted to Captain in 1682. He became was appointed by the Navy Board Resident Commissioner, Portsmouth on 18 June 1702 until 14 January 1705 and the Governor of Greenwich Hospital in 1708.

Gifford also served as member of parliament for Portsmouth from 1702 to 1708 and from 1711 to 1713.

References

|-

|-

Royal Navy officers
1640s births
1724 deaths
Members of the Parliament of Great Britain for English constituencies
English MPs 1705–1707
British MPs 1707–1708
British MPs 1710–1713
17th-century Royal Navy personnel